Bo Thong is a district (amphoe) in Chonburi province, Thailand.

History
Bo Thong was originally a tambon of Phanat Nikhom district. On 16 December 1978 the minor district (king amphoe) was created. On 16 March 1985 it was upgraded to a full district.

Geography
Neighboring districts are (from the north clockwise) Ko Chan of Chonburi Province, Tha Takiap of Chachoengsao province, Kaeng Hang Maeo of Chanthaburi province, Khao Chamao and Wang Chan of Rayong province, and Nong Yai, Ban Bueng and Phanat Nikhom of Chonburi.

Khao Cha-ang (เขาชะอางค์) is an isolated limestone mountain standing on a plain in Bo Thong District. It is an important source of gold and antimony.

Administration
The district is divided into six sub-districts (tambons), which are further subdivided into 47 villages (mubans). Bo Thong is a sub-district municipality (thesaban tambon) which covers parts of the tambons Bo Thong and Wat Suwan. That Thong is a sub-district municipality which covers the whole same-named sub-district. There are a further five tambon administrative organizations (TAO).

Economy
Bo Thong is the largest district of Chonburi. More than half of the area is greenspace. Therefore, there are no industrial plants in the area. The main occupation of residents is agriculture.

References

External links
amphoe.com

Bo Thong